The College of Architecture, Planning and Public Affairs at the University of Texas at Arlington is a professional school of design located in Arlington, Texas.

The School of Architecture's newest program is a graduate-level Certificate in Property Repositioning and Turnaround, added in 2009.

The UT Arlington campus is ideally situated in the center of one of the region’s largest and most diverse urban areas known as the Dallas/Fort Worth Metroplex, creating an ideal laboratory environment where the concepts being discussed in the classroom take shape all around.

Research centers 
 Architecture and Fine Arts Library
 The Center for Metropolitan Density
 David Dillon Center for Texas Architecture

References

External links
 

Architecture
Architecture schools in Texas